John Hewson (born 1946) is a former Australian politician who served as leader of the Liberal Party from 1990 to 1994.

John Hewson may also refer to:

 John Hewson (artist) (1744–1821), English textile artist
 John Hewson (regicide) (died 1662), English soldier in the New Model Army and regicide of Charles I
 Jack Hewson (John G. Hewson Sr., 1924–2012), American basketball player

See also
 John (disambiguation)
 Hewson (disambiguation)
 John Henson (disambiguation)